County Limerick was a parliamentary constituency in Ireland, which returned two Members of Parliament (MPs) to the House of Commons of the Parliament of the United Kingdom from 1801 to 1885.

Boundaries 
This constituency comprised County Limerick, except for the parliamentary borough of Limerick, which was formed the Limerick City constituency.

Members of Parliament

Elections

Elections in the 1830s
Lloyd's death caused a by-election.

 

 On petition, O'Grady was unseated in favour of Massy Dawson.

Elections in the 1840s

 

 

 

O'Brien was adjudged guilty of high treason, causing a by-election.

Elections in the 1850s
Dickson's death caused a by-election.

Monsell was appointed a clerk of ordnance, requiring a by-election.

Goold's death caused a by-election.

Monsell was appointed President of the Board of Health, requiring a by-election.

Elections in the 1860s 

Monsell was appointed Vice-President of the Board of Trade, requiring a by-election.

Elections in the 1870s 
Monsell was appointed Postmaster General of the United Kingdom, requiring a by-election.

Monsell was created a peer in January 1874, voiding his seat, and a writ was to be issued for a by-election. However, this was pre-empted by the dissolution of Parliament later that month

Elections in the 1880s

Notes

References 
 The Parliaments of England by Henry Stooks Smith (1st edition published in three volumes 1844–50), 2nd edition edited (in one volume) by F.W.S. Craig (Political Reference Publications 1973)
 
 

Westminster constituencies in County Limerick (historic)
Constituencies of the Parliament of the United Kingdom established in 1801
Constituencies of the Parliament of the United Kingdom disestablished in 1885